Whau is a local government area in Auckland, in New Zealand's Auckland Region. It is governed by the Whau Local Board and Auckland Council. It is within the council's Whau Ward.

Geography

The area takes its name from Whau River estuary arm of the Waitematā Harbour, which extends into the area.

The area includes the suburbs of Avondale, Blockhouse Bay, Green Bay, Kelston, New Lynn, New Windsor and Rosebank.

New Lynn is the primary retail shopping area, and Kelston and Rosebank have significant industrial areas.

History

Māori used Te Tōanga Waka, or the Whau River portage, as an overland route where waka could be transported between the Pacific Ocean via Waitematā Harbour in the north, and the Tasman Sea via the Manukau Harbour in the south. European settlers also used the area in a similar way in the 19th century.

An extensive regeneration of the New Lynn Metropolitan Centre began in the early 21st century, including upgrades of rail facilities and transport routes.

References

 
West Auckland, New Zealand